Cantwell-Sacred Heart of Mary High School (CSHM), is a private Roman Catholic high school located in Montebello, California, precisely on the border of East Los Angeles and Montebello. It is now owned and operated by the Roman Catholic Archdiocese of Los Angeles. It is fully accredited by the Western Association of Schools and Colleges and the challenging curriculum prepares students for admission to four-year university programs and other career options.

History

Founding
Sacred Heart of Mary High School for young women was founded in 1942, The school was formally dedicated on June 30, 1943,  with Archbishop John J. Cantwell presiding. The Religious of the Sacred Heart of Mary (RSHM), an international apostolic institute of religious women, were commissioned to teach at the new institution. Through their emphasis on liberal arts education and respect for all cultures, the Sisters worked to promote the growth of the human person by creating an environment which enabled young women to work for their own spiritual, educational, and personal development.

In 1946, the Most Reverend John J. Cantwell, Archbishop of Los Angeles, established Cantwell High School. At the time of its founding, the school was temporarily located on the top floor at St. Alphonsus Grade School, in East Los Angeles. On October 23, 1946, the school relocated to  the campus it still occupies on a picturesque seventeen-acres in Montebello, California.  Based on his respect for their teaching abilities, the archbishop invited the Christian Brothers of Ireland to staff the school. The school was dedicated by Archbishop Cantwell on April 13, 1947.

As the flag was raised over the “largest addition to the Archdiocesan school system,”  tribute was paid to the teaching qualities of the Christian Brothers who constituted the initial Cantwell faculty. The Irish Christian Brothers had long influenced Bishop Cantwell as he attended the Patrician Brothers Monastery National School in Fethard in his early childhood years.

On-going changes occurred over the years and with the closure of nearby Sacred Heart of Mary High School in 1990, the girls attending that high school were incorporated into Cantwell-Sacred Heart of Mary High School.

1950s thru 1980s
In 1956, a new building was completed at 441 North Garfield Avenue, and in September, 1957, 450 girls enrolled at the new Sacred Heart of Mary High School.  The Sodality of the Blessed Virgin Mary became the focal point of all religious activities. In 1961, ground was broken for an 800-seat auditorium, and a chapel was constructed adjacent to the convent. Both were completed in 1962. Just the chapel and convent remain today, as the rest of the property was sold.

Under the watchful eyes of the Sacred Heart of Mary sisters, the Catholic boys of Cantwell High came no closer to the girls during school hours than a lingering glance through the chain-link fence. "The sisters were very restrictive," recalled an alumnus whose wife attended Sacred Heart of Mary while he was at Cantwell. "Though we used to look at the girls from afar, the best we could do was cruise by, (until after school)."

Consolidation
Cantwell-Sacred Heart of Mary as an entity began when Sacred Heart of Mary High School, an all girls school administered by the Religious of the Sacred Heart of Mary, and Cantwell High School, an all boys school administered by the Irish Christian Brothers, consolidated into one lay administered coed school in 1991.  For many, especially the alumni of both schools, the consolidation meant the end of an era.    Since the merger, enrollment is at about 600 students. Located in the Roman Catholic Archdiocese of Los Angeles, CSHM is a coeducational, college preparatory institution. The school's spiritual patrons are St. Philip of Jesus, and the Sacred Heart of Mary, Mother of Jesus. With the advent of young women moving to the young men's campus, the Cantwell former school motto for the conjoined schools was changed from the Latin for "Act Manfully", "Viriliter Age", to "Act with the Character of Christ",  "Age cum Anima Christi".  The girls all became "Cardinals" and their mascot "Scooter" was laid to rest without ceremony.

Demographics
The majority of the CSHM families reside in communities surrounding the East Los Angeles area.  95% of the students are Roman Catholic. Economically, the families are characterized as blue collar/skilled labor workers and managers of small privately owned businesses.  52% of the students live below the government designated “poverty” line and would qualify for the federal school lunch program if they attended a public school. CSHM has a very generous financial aid program and close to a fourth of the students work jobs after school to supplement their tuition. As a school it is completely self-supporting with the exception of support from foundations and many donors, including the Religious of the Sacred Heart of Mary, and support from the archdiocese of Los Angeles for the physical plant of the school, and its property.

Athletics
The co-curricular program encourages students to develop mental and physical skills, a healthy competitive spirit, teamwork, and self-discipline.

Fall
Football
Girls' volleyball
Cross Country

Winter
Boys' Basketball
Girls' Basketball
Boys' Soccer
Girls' Soccer

Spring
Baseball
Softball
Track and Field
Volleyball
Golf

Notable alumni

Juan Gómez-Quiñones, professor, activist, and co-author of El Plan de Santa Barbara
Jerry Grote, professional basketball player
Ramone Washington Canadian Football player ...
Philip S. Gutierrez, federal judge
Craig Worthington, professional baseball player
Alice Bag, founder/singer of LA punk band The Bags 
José Orozco, professor, artist, and author of Receive Our Memories: The Letters of Luz Moreno, 1950-1952

Notes and references

External links
Cantwell-Sacred Heart of Mary Website

Educational institutions established in 1991
Roman Catholic secondary schools in Los Angeles County, California
Montebello, California
1991 establishments in California
Catholic secondary schools in California